Gwadar Port Authority Football Club is a Pakistani professional football team based in Gwadar, that competes in the Pakistan Premier League.

History 
Gwadar Port Authority debuted in the 2011–12 PFF League, where they were last in their group. They continued in the 2012–13 PFF League where they came second in their group. In the 2020 PFF League, they came second in their group and qualified for the final stage. They thrashed Pakistan Police in their second match of the final stage. Gwadar Port Authority ended up at third place of the group table and gained promotion to the 2021 Pakistan Premier League. However, they did not compete due to some issues.

Rivalry 
Gwadar Port Authority has a rivalry with Karachi Port Trust FC. In March 2012, Gwadar Port Authority was defeated by Karachi Port Trust 4-1 in their group stage match, which eliminated them from the 2012 National Challenge Cup. Their matches are known as the "Port Derby".

References 

Football clubs in Pakistan
Association football clubs established in 2011
2011 establishments in Pakistan
Sport in Balochistan, Pakistan